Kurt Harland is an American singer, songwriter, and audio engineer and is the lead singer of Information Society. He also works on video game scores, including two of the soundtracks for the Legacy of Kain video game series (Legacy of Kain: Soul Reaver and Soul Reaver 2 in collaboration with Jim Hedges).

Personal life 
Kurt has stated he started performing and making music with Information Society at age 19 in 1982.

Career

Information Society

In early concerts and albums, Harland was credited under the pseudonym "Kurt Valaquen", Valaquen taken from Tolkien, meaning child of light. After the band had achieved mainstream success, he began using his own middle name as his professional last name.

1982–1990 
Formed in 1982, synthpop band Information Society achieved mainstream success for a time in the late eighties and early nineties. They are most widely known for their 1988 hit single "What's on Your Mind (Pure Energy)". The band's last major (top 40) charting release was "Think" in 1990, from the album Hack.

1990–1997 
After the moderate success of Hack, the band released Peace and Love, Inc. in 1992. The album did not achieve much commercial success and failed to chart to a notable degree. MTV were reportedly opposed to playing the music video of the title track on its channel.

After Information Society broke up, Harland kept the rights to the name of the band and worked with Steven Seibold of Hate Dept.. The resulting album titled Don't Be Afraid, was released in 1997. The album resulted in a more industrial influenced sound, purportedly fulfilling the wishes of Harland in pursuing a darker approach that he had previously hoped to explore.

1997–present 
A 2004 episode of VH1's Bands Reunited, caused a brief controversy when Harland refused to appear in an Information Society reunion performance, despite apparently accepting the invitation on-camera by signing a copy of their first album.  In an account of the incident written by Harland and available on his website, Harland disputes VH1's depiction of the events and his portrayal on the show, claiming that the show was edited to make it look as if he had accepted the invitation and then backed out of it.

In 2006, he turned the name back over to Paul Robb and James Cassidy, who reformed the band with a new singer. Harland cited family obligations and a demanding career in not returning full-time; he has since been involved nonetheless, performing at a few concerts, and is featured as a vocalist on their 2007 album Synthesizer. He later rejoined the band full-time, singing and writing for subsequent releases. These additional albums were Hello World in 2014 and Orders of Magnitude in 2016.

Video games
After 11 years as a full-time recording artist, Harland moved to San Francisco and began his career in video game audio engineering.  Over the years he has been involved with eighteen different projects, notably six years with Crystal Dynamics and a stint at Electronic Arts.

Harland has worked on the following:

 1995: Scooby-Doo Mystery — Sunsoft, Mega Drive
 1995: X-Men 2: Clone Wars — Headgames / Sega, Mega Drive
 1995: Ballz — PF Magic, 3DO
 1995: Nightmare Circus — Funcom Oslo / Sega, Mega Drive
 1997: Gex: Enter the Gecko — Crystal Dynamics, PlayStation
 1999: Legacy of Kain: Soul Reaver — Crystal Dynamics, PlayStation / Dreamcast / Windows
 2001: Soul Reaver 2 — Crystal Dynamics, Windows / PlayStation 2
 2003: Whiplash — Crystal Dynamics, PlayStation 2 / Xbox
 2003: Legacy of Kain: Defiance — Crystal Dynamics, Windows / PlayStation 2 / Xbox
 2005: The Godfather — Electronic Arts, PlayStation 2 / Xbox / PC
 2005: Death Jr. – Backbone Entertainment, PSP
 2006: Death Jr. II: Root of Evil – Backbone Entertainment, PSP
 2007: Death Jr. and the Science Fair of Doom – Backbone Entertainment, Nintendo DS
 2011: PlayStation Move Heroes – Nihilistic Software Inc., PlayStation 3 with PlayStation Move
 2012: Resistance: Burning Skies – Nihilistic Software Inc., PlayStation Vita

Four songs from Information Society's album Don't Be Afraid were also used in video games that had their soundtracks composed by Kurt Harland:
 Early versions of "Closing In" and "On the Outside" had been used in the 3DO version of Ballz.
 The instrumental track "Ozar Midrashim" would later be used as the intro theme of Legacy of Kain: Soul Reaver.

References

External links
 InformationSociety.us Official Information Society band website (as of 2007)
 InSoc.org Original official Information Society website (largely a historical archive, written by Kurt Harland)
 InSoc VS. TELEVISION!, an article/account of "what really happened" on VH1's Bands Reunited, according to Kurt Harland
 

Living people
Video game composers
Musicians from Minneapolis
American freestyle musicians
American hi-NRG musicians
American synth-pop musicians
Information Society (band) members
Year of birth missing (living people)